, better known by the stage name , was a Japanese voice actress from Hyōgo Prefecture, Japan. She played Morrigan Aensland in the Darkstalkers video games, and Great Fairy, Koume and Kotake in The Legend of Zelda series. She was associated with Arts Vision.

Filmography

Anime 
1998
 Yoshimotomuchiko Monogatari (Hanaka Mariki Momoko)
1999
 Ai no Wakakusayama Monogatari (Shizuka Kawamura)
 Oruchuban Ebichu (Naoto and others)
 Komu-chan gaiku!! (Mr. Izawa and others)

OVA 
1989
 Megazone 23 - Part III - The Awakening of Eve (Jacob's secretary, operator)
1991
 Makyū Senjō 2 (operator A)
1993
 BADBOYS (mother)
1997
 Konpeki no kantai tokubetsu-hen sōrai kaihatsu monogatari (Nakai)

Video games 
1994
 Advanced V.G. (Miranda Jahana)
 Vampire: The Night Warriors (Morrigan Aensland)
1995
 Vampire Hunter: Darkstalkers' Revenge (Morrigan Aensland)
 Tozasarata Tachi (Tess Conway)
 Super Puzzle Fighter II X (Morrigan Aensland, Devilot)
 Dungeons & Dragons: Shadow over Mystara (Thief)
 Fire Woman Matoigumi (Aiko Aoyama)
1997
 Vampire Savior: The Lord of Vampire (Morrigan Aensland)
 Vampire Savior: The Lord of Vampire 2 (Morrigan Aensland)
 Vampire Hunter 2: Darkstalkers' Revenge (Morrigan Aensland)
 Doki Doki Shutter Chance (Reiko Kisaragi)
 Harmful Park (Cassis)
 Princess Maker: Yumemiru Yousei (Medina & Kurubou)
 Pocket Fighter (Morrigan Aensland)
1998
 The Legend of Zelda: Ocarina of Time (Nabor, Great Fairy, Koume, Kotake)
 Farland Saga: Toki no Michishirube (Sofia)
 Marvel vs.Capcom: Clash of Super Heroes (Morrigan Aensland, Ton Pooh)
 Marl Oukoku no Ningyou Hime (Gao)
1999
 Sengoku Bishōjo Emaki Kūwokiru!! Harukaze no Shō (Rasha)
 Little Princess: Marl Ōkoku no Ningyō Hime 2 (Gao)
2000
 Capcom vs. SNK: Millennium Fight 2000 (Morrigan Aensland)
 The Legend of Zelda: Majora's Mask (Great Fairy, Koume, Kotake)
 Marvel vs.Capcom 2: New Age of Heroes (Morrigan Aensland)
2001
 Capcom vs. SNK: Millennium Fight 2000 PRO (Morrigan Aensland)
 Capcom vs. SNK 2: Millionaire Fighting 2001 (Morrigan Aensland)
 Legaia 2: Duel Saga (Sharon)
2005
 Namco × Capcom (Morrigan Aensland)
2008
 Cross Edge (Morrigan Aensland)
 Tatsunoko vs.Capcom: Cross Generation of Heroes/Tatsunoko vs.Capcom: Ultimate All-Stars (Morrigan Aensland)
2011
 The Legend of Zelda: Ocarina of Time 3D (Nabor, Great Fairy, Koume, Kotake)
2012
 Monster Hunter Frontier Online (Hunter female voice - TYPE 29)
2014
 Super Smash Bros. for Nintendo 3DS / Wii U (Koume, Kotake)
2015
 The Legend of Zelda: Majora's Mask 3D (Great Fairy, Koume, Kotake)

Dubbing

Foreign Movies
 Cannonball 3 Atarashiki Chōsenshatachi (Heather Scott <Mimi · Cajik>)

Drama CD 
 Hokuō Shinwa Densetsu series (Frigg)
1991
 Jubei Kurenai (Imaizumi Yuzue)
1995
 Shōnen Nure Yasuku Koi Nari Gatashi (Nobuko)
1996
 Shōnen Nure Yasuku Koi Nari Gatashi 2 - Samayoeru Meikyū - (tutor of son, woman of black list)
1997
 Kindaichi Shōnen no Jikenbo Shinigami Byōin Satsujin Jiken (Kazuko Takazawa)

References

External links 
 

1965 births
2017 deaths
Arts Vision voice actors
Japanese video game actresses
Japanese voice actresses
Voice actresses from Hyōgo Prefecture
20th-century Japanese actresses
21st-century Japanese actresses